Mount Argus in Antarctica is a large isolated mountain mass, surmounted by three separate peaks, the highest 1,220 meters. It stands between Poseidon Pass and Athene Glacier, 10 nautical miles (18 km) west-northwest of Miller Point, in northeastern Palmer Land. The mountain was photographed from the air by the U.S. Antarctic Service on September 28, 1940. It was the subject of geological investigation by A.G. Fraser of British Antarctic Survey (BAS) in 1961. Named by United Kingdom Antarctic Place-Names Committee (UK-APC) (1963) after the son of the god Zeus in Greek mythology.

References

Mountains of Palmer Land